Zavion Michael Davenport (September 24, 1985August 20, 2020), better known by the stage name Chi Chi DeVayne, was an American drag queen and reality television personality who came to international attention on the eighth season of RuPaul's Drag Race and on the third season of RuPaul's Drag Race All Stars. DeVayne began her drag career in her native Shreveport, Louisiana, where she was known locally prior to her 2016 debut on Drag Race. Following her time on the show, DeVayne embarked on a number of domestic and international tours, and she was featured on several web series about drag. Davenport was diagnosed with scleroderma in 2018 and, two years later, he died following a bout of pneumonia he contracted after a hospital stay for scleroderma-related kidney failure.

Early life and career

Zavion Michael Davenport was born on September 24, 1985, in Shreveport, Louisiana, to Alberteen Wyandon and Zan Davenport III. He had a sister, Brittany; a brother, DaRico Wyandon; and two half-brothers, Zachary and Zamien Willis.

As a child, Davenport took classes in ballet and in West African and modern dance. He described parts of his upbringing as rough: he carried a gun, got into trouble, and joined gangs. In an interview on RuPaul's Drag Race, he said, "Girl, I've seen people shot. I've smelled, like, the smell of brains. When I tell you I come from the streets, I'm not kidding." Davenport attended Fair Park High School, where he was a drum major in the marching band. After graduating in 2003, he began performing in drag on the local nightlife scene. Prior to appearing on Drag Race, Davenport worked two nine-to-five jobs to support himself.

Drag

DeVayne's first name, Chi Chi, was inspired by the character Chi-Chi Rodriguez from To Wong Foo, Thanks for Everything! Julie Newmar, and the surname DeVayne came from the DeVayne drag family of Shreveport. Her drag mothers were Kourtni DeVayne and Lady Phat Kat. DeVayne enjoyed using different shades of purple makeup. In her early days as a drag entertainer, she was a regular performer at the Central Station nightclub in Shreveport, where she became known for her backflips.

DeVayne competed on the eighth season of RuPaul's Drag Race, which began airing on March 7, 2016. HuffPosts James Michael Nichols said she "was the dark horse [of the] season, walking through the doors in the first episode in a dress literally made out of garbage bags". The BBC called her lip sync to "And I Am Telling You I'm Not Going", through which she eliminated fellow contestant Thorgy Thor, "iconic in Drag Race history". Out dubbed the performance one of the series' best lip syncs. DeVayne made it to the top four but was eliminated before Kim Chi and Naomi Smalls; Bob the Drag Queen won the crown. DeVayne said of the experience: "It changed everything in my life. Everything has turned in a different direction. Before, I was just like, 'What's a good job that I could get here in town, working in a factory?'. It's crazy."

DeVayne was interviewed on RuPaul's podcast RuPaul: What's the Tee? in 2016. The next year, she toured with A Drag Queen Christmas, and she was subsequently a cast member of several international live shows featuring Drag Race contestants. In March 2018, she was a part of Max Emerson's series Drag Babies, which was hosted by Bob the Drag Queen. She served as a drag mentor alongside Peppermint and Shuga Cain. DeVayne then appeared on the third season of RuPaul's Drag Race All Stars, which premiered on January 25, 2018. She was eliminated in the fourth episode, originally placing seventh, but she ultimately finished eighth after Morgan McMichaels returned to the competition. DeVayne credited her experience on Drag Race with helping her heal from some of the difficulties of her past.

Personal life

Davenport was openly gay. In 2018, he was diagnosed with scleroderma, an autoimmune condition. He reported that the disease had caused him to lose weight and had reduced his capacity to dance in early 2020. On July 17 of that year, he was rushed to the hospital with hypertension and scleroderma-related kidney failure. This prompted fans and fellow Drag Race contestants to initiate fundraising efforts for his medical bills. Two days later, he posted an update on social media, saying, "I let it go too long without going to the doctor, and these are the consequences". He also expressed appreciation for the outpouring of support from fans and colleagues, and he stated that he was undergoing dialysis treatment. Four weeks later, Davenport was readmitted to the hospital with pneumonia. During that time, he made his final social media post, a video asking fans to keep him in their prayers and promising to "be back soon". He died on August 20, 2020, at the age of 34.

Celebrities including Padma Lakshmi, Ross Mathews and Miss Coco Peru paid tribute to DeVayne. Many fellow Drag Race contestants also expressed condolences; these included Aja, Alexis Mateo, Alexis Michelle, Aquaria, BeBe Zahara Benet, Bianca Del Rio, Cheryl Hole, Detox, Farrah Moan, Heidi N Closet, India Ferrah, Jaida Essence Hall, Kennedy Davenport, Monét X Change, Nina Bo'nina Brown, Ongina, Pandora Boxx, Peppermint, Priyanka, Roxxxy Andrews, Shea Couleé, Tatianna, Trinity the Tuck, Trixie Mattel and The Vivienne. In a memorial post, GLAAD called DeVayne "an incredible performer and such a bright light".

The finale episode of RuPaul's Drag Race season 13—the first to air after DeVayne's death—contained a tribute segment wherein RuPaul and several former contestants shared memories of DeVayne's life and work. In 2022, director Stephen Dunn announced that DeVayne was meant to play the character Bussy on Queer as Folk, but she was replaced by Armand Fields after she died. Dunn stated that he set the series in New Orleans due to his longtime friendship with DeVayne.

Discography

Filmography

Television

Web series

Music videos

Theatre

References

External links 

1985 births
2020 deaths
African-American drag queens
Deaths from kidney failure
Deaths from pneumonia in Louisiana
Deaths from scleroderma
Gay entertainers
LGBT people from Louisiana
People from Shreveport, Louisiana
Chi Chi DeVayne
Chi Chi DeVayne